O. nana may refer to:
 Octomeria nana, an orchid species
 Oreophryne nana, the Camiguin narrow-mouthed frog, a frog species endemic to the Philippines
 Oithona nana, a widespread marine cyclopoid copepod

See also
 Nana (disambiguation)